Trooper Jim Foster (died July 5, 1996) was an American politician. He served as a Democratic member for the 65th district of the Florida House of Representatives.

Life and career 
Foster was a highway patrol trooper.

In 1972, Foster was elected to represent the 65th district of the Florida House of Representatives, succeeding T. Terrell Sessums. He served until 1982, when he was succeeded by Elvin L. Martinez.

Foster died in July 1996 in Missouri, at the age of 62.

References 

Year of birth missing
1996 deaths
Democratic Party members of the Florida House of Representatives
20th-century American politicians